Juan Anthony LaFonta (born November 1972) is a New Orleans personal injury attorney and former Democratic State Representative for Louisiana representing Louisiana House District 96. He was elected in 2005 during a special election and was unopposed in his 2007 re-election.

LaFonta served as Louisiana first Freshmen legislator elected to Chairman of the Black Caucus. LaFonta also served on the Commerce Committee, the Insurance Committee, and the Retirement Committee. After Hurricane Katrina, LaFonta also served on the House Special Committee on Disaster Planning, Crisis Management, Recovery and Long-Term Revitalization.

Early life and education 
Juan LaFonta was born November 1972 in New Orleans. He is the son of a bricklayer and public school teacher. A graduate of Brother Martin High School, LaFonta received his undergraduate degree from the University of New Orleans (1997) and his Juris Doctor from Southern University Law Center (2000.) LaFonta is also a former adjunct professor at Dillard University in New Orleans. LaFonta is of Creole descent.

Law practice 
Juan Lafonta and Associates, L.L.C., October 2001 – present. 20 years experience, managing a high volume personal injury law practice servicing thousands of clients while managing the staff and logistics for operations. Drafted motions, conducted trials, and helped assist my client and associates in any way possible to become a well respected and organized law firm in New Orleans, Louisiana. First trial in 2004 went for 1 million dollars.  Adjudicated or negotiated millions since the first trial.
Currently, LaFonta is regarded as one of the top African-American Lawyers in Louisiana. In 2016, LaFonta became a lifetime charter member of the Rue Ratings' "Best Attorneys of America" and Rue Ratings' "Best Law Firm."

Political career 
Juan LaFonta was elected to the Louisiana State Legislature in 2005 under a special election several months before Hurricane Katrina. LaFonta, represented District 96 which include the historic neighborhoods of Faubourg, Marigny, Treme and Gentilly. LaFonta was the first ever freshman legislator to be elected to a caucus in U.S. history when he became chair of the Louisiana Legislative Black Caucus.

According to OurCampaigns.com  LaFonta is "committed to economic development in his community, working to ease the tax burden on local businesses to help create jobs. He is a believer in accessible healthcare, championing the effort to rebuild Charity Hospital and pushing legislation to expand healthcare coverage and requirements on insurance companies." LaFonta served on several committees during his run in office including the Commerce Committee, the Retirement Committee, the Insurance Committee.

After Hurricane Katrina, LaFonta served the House Special Committee on Disaster Planning, Crisis Management, Recovery and Long-Term Revitalization. LaFonta also negotiated 1.2 billion dollars for the gulf coast region after Hurricane Katrina.

After losing the 2010 Democratic nomination in the 2010 U.S. House of Representatives elections, 2nd District, to fellow Democrat legislator Cedric Richmond, LaFonta endorsed the incumbent Republican Joseph Cao, who was subsequently unseated by Richmond. LaFonta did not seek reelection to the state House in the 2011 primary. He was succeeded on January 9, 2012, by a fellow Democrat, Terry Landry, a former superintendent of the Louisiana State Police from Lafayette Parish.

Other notable positions 
 Adjunct Professor of Public Health Law at Dillard University New Orleans
 First Freshman legislator to be elected Chairman of the Louisiana Legislative Black Caucus 
 Louisiana State Representative District #96
 Louisiana Latino Commission, Member
 Phi Beta Sigma fraternity member

Awards 
 Kentucky Colonel, 2007
 Louisiana State Troopers Association, Legislator of the Year, 2011

See also
United States House of Representatives elections in Louisiana, 2010#District 2

References

External links
Representative Juan A. LaFonta official Louisiana House of Representatives site
Juan LaFonta for Congress official campaign site
 
Campaign contributions from OpenSecrets.org

1972 births
Living people
Democratic Party members of the Louisiana House of Representatives
Politicians from New Orleans
Lawyers from New Orleans
Brother Martin High School alumni
African-American lawyers
African-American state legislators in Louisiana
21st-century African-American people
20th-century African-American people